The 1935 Utah Utes football team was an American football team that represented the University of Utah as a member of the Rocky Mountain Conference (RMC) during the 1935 college football season. In their 11th season under head coach Ike Armstrong, the Utes compiled an overall record of 4–3–1 with a mark of 4–1–1 in conference play, placed third in the RMC, and outscored all opponents by a total of 166 to 69.

Schedule

References

Utah
Utah Utes football seasons
Utah Utes football